Sextons Creek  river in Clay County in the U.S. state of Kentucky is a tributary of the South Fork of Kentucky River in neighbouring Owsley County, Kentucky.
It was named for a Sexton family of settlers who arrived some time before 1815.

Tributaries and post offices 

The Bray Creek tributary used to be considered Sextons Creek proper, and what is now the main Sextons Creek used to be named its Right Fork.

The eponymous postoffice was originally named Section Creek in error when established by postmaster Henry Clark on 1828-05-24.
This was rectified on 1843-03-15.

 Potters Choice, later Choice, at the head of Bray Creek
 Potters Choice, later Choice, serving a village
 Burning Springs, Kentucky
 Chesnut Hill, more simply Chesnut
 Chesnutburg
 Adela, later Murray, now Muncy Fork for the same named tributary of Bray Creek
 Malcom
 Alger
 Sacker Gap
 Ethal, later Ethel
 Vine, on the Falling Timber Branch, serving Ivy
 Sourwood

See also
List of rivers of Kentucky

Cross-reference

Sources

 

Rivers of Kentucky
Rivers of Clay County, Kentucky